The women's Keirin at the 2012 Olympic Games in London took place at the London Velopark on 3 August. Women's Keirin made its debut in this Olympics.

Great Britain's Victoria Pendleton won the gold medal. Guo Shuang from China won silver and Lee Wai Sze took bronze for Hong Kong's only medal of the 2012 Games.

Competition format

The Keirin races involved 5.5 laps of the track behind a motorcycle, followed by a 2.5 lap sprint to the finish. The tournament consisted of preliminary heats and repechages, a semi-finals round, and the finals. The heats and repechages narrowed the field to 12. The semi-finals divided the remaining 12 into six finalists. The finals round also included a ranking race for 7th to 12th place.

Schedule 
All times are British Summer Time

Results

First round

Heat 1

Heat 2

Heat 3

Repechages

Repechage 1

Repechage 2

Second round

Heat 1

Heat 2

7th–12th final

Final

References

Track cycling at the 2012 Summer Olympics
Cycling at the Summer Olympics – Women's keirin
Olymp
Women's events at the 2012 Summer Olympics